Erdoğan Atalay (born 22 September 1966) is a German actor. He is known for his role as police detective Semir Gerkhan in Alarm für Cobra 11 - Die Autobahnpolizei.

Early life and career
Atalay was born in Hanover, West Germany, to a Turkish father and German mother. He was a member of the Theater-AG at the IGS Garbsen. At age 18, he made his first appearance as a supporting role in "Aladdin and the Magic Lamp" at the National Theatre of Hanover before studying acting at the Hochschule für Musik und Theater Hamburg. Afterwards he took on guest roles in several German television series such as Music Groschenweise, Einsatz für Lohbeck, Doppelter Einsatz and Die Wache.

In March 1996, Action Concept cast Atalay in what would become his breakthrough role, starring as Semir Gerkhan, a police detective of Turkish origin. Atalay co-wrote the screenplay for one of the series' episodes, titled "Checkmate," and is a consulting producer for the series as of 2016. In 2005, Atalay published a short story, "Die Türkei ist da oben" ("Turkey is Up There"), in the German-Turkish anthology Was lebbt du?. In September 2012 he shot together with Ilka Bessin (Cindy from Marzahn) the short film "Alarm for Cindy 11", a parody of Alarm for Cobra 11. The short film was broadcast on September 15, 2012 in the program.

Personal life
Atalay's first marriage was to film and theatre actress Astrid Pollmann in 2004; the couple separated in late 2009. They have one daughter, Pauletta, who has also starred alongside her father in Alarm für Cobra 11 as Ayda Gerkhan, the middle child of Semir Gerkhan. His second child was born in mid-2012 to makeup artist and manager Katja Ohneck, with whom he is married as of 2017.

Filmography

Film
1997: Sperling und der falsche Freund
1998: Der Clown
2000: Liebe Pur
2002: 
2006: Hammer und Hart
2011: Geister all inclusive
2015: Macho Man
2018: Asphaltgorillas

TV
1990: Musik Groschenweise
1994: Die Wache
1995: Doppelter Einsatz
1996–present: Alarm für Cobra 11 – Die Autobahnpolizei
1999–2000: Hinter Gittern – Der Frauenknast (3 episodes)
2003: 
2010: C.I.S. – Chaoten im Sondereinsatz
2012: SOKO 5113
2012: Cindy aus Marzahn und die jungen Wilden
2013: Mordkommission Istanbul
2016: SOKO Stuttgart – Fluch des Geldes
since 2019: Die Martina Hill Show (7 episodes, Alarm für Mutti 11)

Theatre
1984: Aladdin and the Magic Lamp (Staatstheater Hannover)

References

External links

Official MySpace

1966 births
German male stage actors
German male television actors
Living people
German people of Turkish descent
Hochschule für Musik und Theater Hamburg alumni
20th-century German male actors
21st-century German male actors